Devar Bhabhi is a 1958 Hindi film. It stars Balraj Sahni, Rajendra Kumar, Mala Sinha in lead roles.

Soundtrack

External links
 

1958 films
1950s Hindi-language films
Films scored by Ravi